Caliphis is a genus of mites in the family Ologamasidae. There are about 8 described species in Caliphis.

Species
These 8 species belong to the genus Caliphis:

 Caliphis calvus Lee, 1970
 Caliphis eugenitalis Karg, 1993
 Caliphis hickmani (Womersley, 1956)
 Caliphis minisetae (Karg, 1993)
 Caliphis novaezelandiae (Womersley, 1956)
 Caliphis queenslandicus (Womersley, 1956)
 Caliphis schusteri (Hirschmann, 1966)
 Caliphis tamborinensis (Womersley, 1956)

References

Ologamasidae